Notapictinus aurivillii, the piesmatids, is a species of flat bug in the family Aradidae. It is found in North America.

References

Aradidae
Articles created by Qbugbot
Insects described in 1887